David H. Buss (born February 18, 1956) is a native of Lancaster, Pennsylvania and a retired  vice admiral of the United States Navy. His last assignment was as Commander, Naval Air Forces and Commander, Naval Air Force, Pacific in San Diego, California, a position also known as the Navy's "Air Boss."  Prior to taking command as the "Air Boss," Buss served as the Deputy Commander, United States Fleet Forces Command in Norfolk, Virginia. He also commanded Task Force 20 (formerly United States Second Fleet), where he was responsible for training and certifying all Atlantic Fleet naval forces for overseas deployment. A career Naval Flight Officer, Buss served in multiple jet squadrons and staff assignments, and has commanded at every level of the navy from commander to vice admiral.

Buss was succeeded as Commander, Naval Air Forces and Commander, Naval Air Force Pacific by Vice Admiral Mike Shoemaker in January 2015.

Educational background
  United States Naval Academy, 1978, Bachelor of Science (Physics)
  United States Navy Nuclear Propulsion training, 1997
  University of North Carolina, Kenan-Flagler Business School, 2007 (Exec. Ed)

Previous assignments
Buss commanded the A-6 Intruder squadron, Attack Squadron 34 (1995–96);  the fast combat support ship  (2000–01); the nuclear-powered aircraft carrier  (2003–06); and Carrier Strike Group 12, the USS Enterprise Carrier Strike Group (2009–10).

Buss also served in Baghdad, Iraq (2008–09) as Director, Strategy/Plans/Assessments (J-5) for Multi-National Force Iraq (MNF-I) where he oversaw the planning effort for the initial troop draw down from the height of the 2007–08 surge.

Awards and decorations
Buss is authorized to wear the following:

References

External links

 Profile  from United States Navy website

1956 births
Living people
United States Navy personnel of the Gulf War
United States Navy personnel of the Iraq War
Recipients of the Distinguished Flying Cross (United States)
Recipients of the Legion of Merit
Recipients of the Navy Distinguished Service Medal
United States Navy vice admirals
United States Naval Academy alumni